The Sarcoman is an entertainment robot remotely controlled by a human operator (For example, an appropriately trained comedian). The System was used by Ford for all exhibitions and auto shows during the 1995 Season. It can also be computer-controlled for automated shows.  It is made by Sarcos.

External links
Sarcoman's Webpage
Sarcos
Sarcoman Videos

Entertainment robots
Robots of the United States
1995 robots
Bipedal humanoid robots